Silea is a comune (municipality) in the Province of Treviso in the Italian region Veneto, located about  north of Venice and about  east of Treviso.

Silea borders the following municipalities: Carbonera, Casale sul Sile, Casier, Roncade, San Biagio di Callalta, Treviso.

Demographic evolution

References

Cities and towns in Veneto